is a railroad tunnel in Gunma and Niigata Prefectures of Japan, operated by JR East Jōetsu Line. The name originates from the Shimizu mountain pass nearby. There are three tunnels near each other, which are the Shimizu Tunnel, the Shin-Shimizu Tunnel, and the Dai-Shimizu Tunnel.

Shimizu tunnel
The Shimizu tunnel is the oldest of the three, opened in 1931 after nine years of construction. The length of the tunnel is 9,702 m, and has a single track. This tunnel was the longest in Japan at the time. Because of technical difficulties at the time, in addition to the main tunnel, two spiral tunnels were built along the mountain pass route, with a curve radius of 800 m.

The construction improved the journey time between Niigata and Tokyo, decreasing it by 4 hours since trains no longer needed to go through the Usui Pass. Because the tunnel was too long to be suitable for steam locomotives, the tracks in and around the tunnel were electrified from the beginning.

Shin-Shimizu tunnel
The Shin-Shimizu tunnel was made in 1967 to make the line double track, because of a high demand of transportation on the Joetsu line. The tunnel is 13,500 m long.

References

 

Railway tunnels in Japan
Tunnels completed in 1931